The autoroute (highway or motorway) system in France consists largely of toll roads (76% of the total). On road signs, autoroute destinations are shown in blue, while destinations reached through a combination of autoroutes are shown with an added autoroute logo. Toll autoroutes are signalled with the word péage (toll or toll plaza).

Length

Numbering scheme
Unlike other motorway systems, there is no systematic numbering system, but there is a clustering of Autoroute numbers based on region.

A1, A3, A4, A5, A6, A10, A13, A14, A15, A16 radiate clockwise from Paris with A2, A11, and A12 branching from A1, A10, and A13, respectively. A7 begins in Lyon, where A6 ends. A8 and A9 begin from the A7.

The 20s are found in northern France. The 30s are found in eastern France. The 40s are found near the Alps. The 50s are in the southeast, near the French Riviera. The 60s are found in southern France. The 70s are found in the centre of the country. The 80s are found in western France.

Named routes

Autoroutes are often given a name, even if these are not very used:
A1 is the autoroute du Nord (Northern motorway).
A4 is the autoroute de l'Est (Eastern motorway).
A6 and A7 are autoroutes du Soleil (Motorways of the Sun), as both lead from northern France to the sunny beach resorts of southern France.
A8 is named La provençale as it cross the geographical region of Provence.
A9 is named La Languedocienne as it crosses the geographic region of Languedoc
A10 is named L'Aquitaine because it leads to Bordeaux and the region Nouvelle-Aquitaine.
A11 is named L'Oceane because it leads to the Atlantic Ocean (Nantes)
A13 is named the autoroute de Normandie as it traverses the region Normandy.
A16 is named L'Européenne (the European) because it connects Paris with several European destinations such as the Belgium–France border, as well as Calais, which is connected with England.
A20 is named L'occitane as it leads to the region Occitanie in south-west France.
A21 is named the rocade minière (mining road) because it crosses the Nord-Pas de Calais Mining Basin, the largest mining stub in France.
A26 is named the autoroute des Anglais (motorway of the English) as it connects Calais, the main point of arrival for cars and lorries from the UK, before continuing to Troyes, and through the Champagne region, whose wines are loved by the British. In addition it passes near the sites of the most famous battles fought by the British Army in World War I, such as Arras, Cambrai and the Somme and not far from Ypres and Mons in Belgium. It also passes sites of earlier UK interest such as Crecy and The Field of the Cloth of Gold.
A35 is called l'Alsacienne or autoroute des Cigognes (Storks' motorways)as it passes only through the historical region of Alsace, for whom storks are a cultural symbol
A36 is called la Comtoise after the region Franche Comté
 A40 is named the autoroute blanche (white motorway) as it connects the French winter resort towns and the Alps.
 The A61 and A62 are named autoroute des deux mers (the two seas motorway) because these roads connect the Atlantic Ocean and the Mediterranean Sea from Bordeaux via Toulouse to Narbonne.
A68 is called autoroute du Pastel because it leads to Albi and to the Lauragais where woad was cultivated to produce pastel.
A71 is called L'Arverne.
A75 is called La Méridienne.
A77 is called Autoroute de l'Arbre.
A84 is called Autoroute des Estuaires. It is part of the main route between Belgium and Spain, avoiding Paris.
A104, one of Paris's beltways, is also known as La Francilienne because it circles the region of Ile-de-France.

Administration
The status of motorways in France has been the subject of debate through years, from their construction until recently. Originally, the autoroutes were built by private companies mandated by the French government and followed strict construction rules as described below. They are operated and maintained by mixed companies held in part by private interests and in part by the state. Those companies hold concessions, which means that autoroutes belong to the French state and their administration to semi-private companies. The different companies are as follows:
 ALIS (SEM, SAPN 8%, Bouygues 20.2%, Ixis 26%, DTP Terrassement 13.44%), operating the A28 Rouen-Alençon 125 km, Alis, official site
 SAPRR (Autoroutes Paris-Rhin-Rhône), 1801 km, SAPRR, official site
 AREA (Société des Autoroutes Rhône-Alpes, SAPRR Subsidiary at 99.82%), 381 km, AREA, official site
 ASF (Autoroutes du sud de la France), 2325 km, ASF, official site (bought by vinci-autoroutes.com Vinci)
 ATMB Autoroutes et tunnels du Mont-Blanc, 107 km, ATMB, official site
 CEVM (Viaduc de Millau, groupe Eiffage), 2.5 km, CEVM, official site
 Cofiroute (Compagnie Industrielle et Financière des Autoroutes, private company part of Vinci group), 896 km, Cofiroute, official site
 Escota (Société des Autoroutes Esterel-Côte d'Azur, ASF group), 460 km, Escota, official site (bought by vinci-autoroutes.com Vinci)
 Sanef (Société des autoroutes du Nord et de l'Est de la France), A.C.S. group (Spain), 1317 km, SANEF, official site
 SAPN (Société des autoroutes Paris-Normandie, SEM, groupe Sanef), 366 km, SAPN, official site
 SFTRF, Société française du tunnel routier du Fréjus, 67 km, SFRTF, official site

Only in the Brittany region do most of the autoroutes belong to the government. They are operated by the regional council and are free from tolls.

Safety on French autoroutes

Motorway Speed Limits
France has the following speed limits for limited access roads classified as motorways:
 Under normal conditions - 
 In rain or wet road conditions - 
 In heavy fog or snowy/icy conditions - 

Limited access roads classified as express roads have lower speed limit.

There is no minimum speed on the others lanes, however the speed must be adapted to the conditions and not constitute a hazard by being too low.

Safe design

The autoroutes are designed to increase driver safety and allow for higher speed limits than on regular roads without increasing the risk of accidents.

The safety features include:
 wider carriageways, with at least 2 (often 3) lanes driving in the same direction, with a larger turning radius - some recently built autoroutes have one-lane-only sections; for privately operated motorways, in 2017, the proportion is 6800 km (74%) in 2x2 lanes, 2252 km (25%) in 2x3 lanes, 84 km (1%) in 2x4 lanes. Each lane is 3.5m wide.
 long entrance and exit ramps or slip roads to get in or out of the autoroute without disturbing the traffic;
 an emergency lane, where it is forbidden to drive (except for emergency services), to park (except in case of emergency) and to walk; Since 2000, new emergency lanes on newly built motorways should be 2.5m wide (or 3m if there are more than 2000 trucks a day). According to the 2000 standard, the emergency lane must be included in a 10m wide (8.5m for sections limited to 110 km/h) security zone without obstacles (in case the security zone includes an upwards slope, it is limited to the line where the slope reaches a height of 3m).
 presence of emergency call boxes every  on each side, that allow to call for help with the possibility to locate the call; some call boxes have flashing light that warn when there is a problem ahead;

 rest areas (aire de repos, i.e. car park with public toilets) every  (4–6 minutes of driving) and service areas (aire de service with a least a gas station) every  (20–30 minutes of driving) - on most recently built autoroutes these distances may be longer, up to 30/60km;
 regularly patrolling security services, to clear any obstacle and protect drivers in trouble (usually a breakdown or a flat tyre) with appropriate warning signs and beacons;
 dynamic information panels that warn about possible difficulties ahead (e.g. accident, roadworks, traffic jam);
 a radio station (107.7 MHz in FM) provides traffic information bulletins every 15 minutes (with a report in English in certain areas) and breaking news for emergencies;
 on heavy traffic days (e.g. beginning and end of school holidays), specific information and recreation events may be organised in rest areas;
 radars automatiques (speed cameras) are installed in many locations, and announced by a specific road sign.

Safety results

Fatalities on motorways have decreased between 2002 and 2016.

Fatalities accidents scenario

On French motorways, in 2016, 121 fatal accidents are direct/initial accidents representing 82% of fatal accidents, 16 (11%) fatal accidents occurs after a previous accident, and 10 (7%) fatal accidents occur after an incident.

Three scenarios catch two-thirds of initial accidents:
 A01 simple collision of two vehicle without direction change
 A06 crash on protection system such as safety traffic barrier
 A05 loss of vehicle control

Fatalities and accidents remaining factors

Most of fatalities occur by night.

Several factor of accidents are more highly probable by night in proportion to the traffic, although inattentiveness remains risky during the day.

Young drivers

Young drivers between 18 and 34 years old represent 19% of motorway drivers, but they are overrepresented in fatal motor vehicle collisions
and are involved in more than half of fatal accidents.

Pedestrians
Although pedestrians are forbidden on motorways in conformity with the Vienna Convention, they are still sometimes killed on motorways.

In case a vehicle on a carriage cannot move, motorways safety rules remains applicable: it is forbidden for a pedestrian to travel on the motorway by article 421-2 from the "Code de la route" law. For this reason, in case of accident or breakdown, it is advised to turn on hazard warning lights, wear high-visibility clothing, and go in a safer place such as the other side from the traffic barrier where there is no traffic. Since 2008, it is clarified that warning triangles are no longer mandatory when they would endanger the driver of the disabled vehicle.

Economics

The toll roads were granted as concessions to mixed-economy corporations; the free roads are directly administered by the national government. Tolls are either based on a flat-rate for access to the road or on the distance driven. The latter case is the most common for long distances; users take a ticket from an automatic machine when they enter the autoroute, and pay according to the distance when exiting; toll booths accept multiple payment methods.

In 2005, the Villepin government proposed a controversial plan to sell all of the state's holdings in autoroute companies to private investors. Critics contend that the price announced is well below the profit forecasts for these companies, and thus that the government sacrifices the future to solve current budgetary problems.

List of Autoroutes

Others

 A1(972): Around Fort-de-France. Autoroute in Martinique, a French overseas territory.
 A104: The Francilienne around the Île-de-France (Paris) region
 A105: Combs-la-Ville
 A110: Ablis - Tours (proposed)
 A115: A15 (Sannois) - Méry-sur-Oise
 A131: Bourneville (A13 exit 26) - Le Havre
 A132: A13 / Pont-L'Évêque - Canapville
 A154: A13 - Louviers
 A199: Torcy - Champs-sur-Marne (downgraded into RD 199)
 A203: Charleville-Mézières - Glaire
 A211: A21 - N17
 A216: A16/A26 - N216 Calais
 A260: Boulogne-sur-Mer - A26
 A320: A4 - Germany
 A330: Nancy - Richardménil
 A391: A39 - RN83
 A404: Saint-Martin-du-Frêne - Oyonnax - Arbent
 A406: Mâcon
 A430: Chamousset - Gilly-sur-Isère
 A432: Saint-Laurent-de-Mure - Montluel
 A508: Tunnel (access to Monaco)
 A570: A57 - Hyères
 A620: A61 - A62 ( West ring of Toulouse)
 A621: Toulouse - Blagnac
 A623: A620 - A61
 A624: Toulouse - Colomiers
 A630: Lormont - Bègles
 A631: Bègles
 A641: Oeyregave - Orthevielle
 A645: Ponlat-Taillebourg - Seilhan
 A660: Mios - Gujan-Mestras
 A680: Castelmaurou - Verfeil
 A710: Gerzat - Clermont-Ferrand
 A711: Lempdes - Pont-du-Château
 A712: Lempdes - Pont-du-Château
 A714: Bizeneuille - Saint-Victor
 A719: Gannat - Monteignet-sur-l'Andelot
 A750: A75 to Clermont-l'Hérault - Montpellier
 A810: La Rochelle - A10
 A811: Carquefou - Sainte-Luce-sur-Loire
 A813:Banneville-la-Campagne-Frénouville
 A831: Rochefort - La Rochelle - Fontenay-le-Comte
 A837 Autoroute des Oiseaux: Rochefort - Écurat (A10)
 A844: A11-A82

Radio coverage 

The FM 107.7 radio coverage is available in 2017 on 8902 kilometres of the (ASFA) network.
This is list of highways that are updated in 107.7 FM every 15 minutes, live 24/7 (if the highway is said alone, it means that the station covers all around it):

Sanef 107.7 (1850km) 
 Nord
 A1: Roissy-en-France - Carvin
 A2: A1 - Hordain
 A16: L'Isle-d'Adam - Boulogne-sur-Mer
 A26: Calais - Saint-Quentin
 A29: Neufchâtel-en-Bray - Saint-Quentin
 Est
 A4: Noisy-le-Grand - Reichstett
 A26: Saint-Quentin - northern Troyes
 A314
 A315
 A344
 Ouest
 A13: Orgeval - Caen
 A14: Carrières-sur-Seine - Orgeval
 A29: (Beuzeville - Saint-Saëns; outside Normandy)
 A132
 A139
 A154
 A813

Autoroute INFO (2487km) 
 Centre-Est (live from Dijon)
 A5: Lieusant - Langres
 A6: Fleury-en-Bière - Limonest
 A19: Courtenay - Sens
 A26: northern Troyes - southern Troyes
 A31: Beaune - Toul
 A36: Beaune - Mulhouse
 A39: Dijon - Bourg-en-Bresse
 A40: Mâcon - Bellegarde
 A46: Anse - Vaulx-en-Velin
 A71: Bourges - Clermont-Ferrand
 A77: A6 - Cosne-Cours-sur-Loire
 A105
 A311
 A391
 A406
 A411
 A430
 A714
 Rhône-Alpes (live from Chambéry)
 A40: Bellegarde - Le Fayet
 A41: Genève - Chambéry - Grenoble
 A42: Bourg-en-Bresse - Vaulx-en-Velin
 A43: Saint-Priest - Chambéry - Tunnel du Fréjus
 A48: Bourgoin-Jallieu - Saint-Égrève
 A49
 A51: Le Pont de Claix - Col du Fau

Environment
99% of the privately managed network is protected by natural fencing.

Privately managed motorways have 1764 wildlife crossing structures.

See also
Transport in France
List of controlled-access highway systems
Evolution of motorway construction in European nations

References

External links

Official Website of the ASFA, with information on the Autoroute network and instructions on how to use them
Motorway numbers in France (route log)
The automatic tolling system in France: Liber-t
Driving in France - autoroutes and other routes
Go Camp France - List of French autoroute companies

 
Lists of roads in France